Monochamus regularis is a species of beetle in the family Cerambycidae. It was described by Per Olof Christopher Aurivillius in 1924. It is known from Malaysia, Borneo and Sumatra.

References

regularis
Beetles described in 1924